Parkgate is a small village in County Antrim, Northern Ireland.  It lies at the foot of Donegore Hill, near the Six Mile Water. It is about midway between Ballyclare and Antrim town. It lies within the Borough of Antrim. It had a population of 676 people in the 2011 Census.

Population

2011 Census
In the 2011 Census Parkgate had a population of 676 people (256 households).

2001 Census 
Parkgate is classified as a small village or hamlet by the NI Statistics and Research Agency (NISRA) (i.e. with population between 500 and 1,000 people).
On Census day (29 April 2001) there were 646 people living in Parkgate. Of these:
26.7% were aged under 16 years and 14.8% were aged 60 and over
50.3% of the population were male and 49.7% were female
4.0% were from a Catholic background and 92.4% were from a Protestant background
2.0% of people aged 16–74 were unemployed.

See also 
List of towns and villages in Northern Ireland

References 

Megalithomania - Parkgate holestone

External links
 The Man From Peru

Villages in County Antrim